"A Song for Chi" is an instrumental alternative metal song recorded by several high-profile rock and metal musicians to raise money for poet and Deftones bassist Chi Cheng, who was severely injured in a car crash in Santa Clara, California on November 4, 2008. All profits from the song went directly to Cheng and his family for the purpose of paying for his medical care. Cheng died in April 2013.

Recording
The project was initiated by fellow bassist Reginald "Fieldy" Arvizu of Korn in May 2009, besides himself Arvizu revealed that former Army of Anyone and current Korn drummer Ray Luzier, Slipknot's Jim Root, Sevendust's Clint Lowery and Korn guitarist Brian Welch would also be recording for the project. The project would also be the first collaboration between Welch and any of his former bandmates since his departure from the band in 2005. Recordings for the song continued to take place at various venues and studios throughout the world during Korn's Escape From the Studio Tour. On June 8 Machine Head's Dave McClain recorded drums for the song on stage in Berlin before Machine Head opened for Korn. On June 17 Sevendust's Morgan Rose and Clint Lowery recorded drums and guitars respectively in Paris. At the Sonisphere Festival in the Netherlands former Ozzy Osbourne and current Metallica bassist Robert Trujillo recorded bass for the song. Adam Dutkiewicz of Killswitch Engage tracked guitars for the song on June 24 in  San Sebastian, Spain. On June 28 Hatebreed guitarist Wayne Lozinak recorded for the song backstage at the Graspop Metal Meeting in Dessel, Belgium. Former Korn guitarist Brian Welch and his former bandmate James Shaffer recorded guitars for the song on June 1 and 6 respectively. In addition to these recordings musicians such as Mike Wengren, Noah Bernardo and Sid Wilson also recorded for the song. The music was produced by Fieldy along with StillWell's Q-Unique and mixed by Jim Monti. The song is available for free via music download on its official website where donations are also accepted. All proceeds will go directly to Cheng and his family.

Personnel

Guitarists
Brian Welch from Korn and Love & Death: guitars
Jim Root from Slipknot: guitars
Adam Dutkiewicz from Killswitch Engage: guitars
Clint Lowery from Sevendust: guitars
James Shaffer from Korn: guitars
Wayne Lozinak from Hatebreed: guitars

Bassists
Reginald Arvizu from Korn: bass
Robert Trujillo from Metallica: bass

Drummers
Mike Wengren from Disturbed: drums
Ray Luzier from Korn: drums
Noah Bernardo from P.O.D.: drums
Dave McClain from Machine Head: drums
Morgan Rose from Sevendust: drums

Technical

Reginald Arvizu: production
Sid Wilson from Slipknot: turntables
Q-Unique: production, engineering

Ralph Patlan: engineering
Jim Monti: mixing

See also

References

External links
A Song for Chi - Official Website
One Love for Chi - Official Website

Rock instrumentals
2009 songs